Tai Tam Country Park is a country park in the Tai Tam area in the south end of Hong Kong Island. At , the park consists of one fifth of Hong Kong Island's land mass. During World War II, the Japanese encountered strong resistance from British defence forces here. So that the park preserves bloody memories from that period.

The park was designated in 1977 with attractions like:

Jardine's Lookout
Tai Tam Upper Reservoir
Tai Tam Byewash Reservoir
Tai Tam Tuk Reservoir
Tai Tam Intermediate Reservoir
Tai Tam Forts
 Mount Parker, the second highest peak on Hong Kong Island
 Mount Butler

Granite rocks in the north and volcanic rocks in the south form the geological composition of this area.

Another country park adjacent to it, named Tai Tam Country Park (Quarry Bay Extension), was designated in 1979.

References

External links

Tai Tam Country Park

 

Country parks and special areas of Hong Kong
Tai Tam
1977 establishments in Hong Kong